The 2012–13 I liga was the 65th season of the second tier domestic division in the Polish football league system since its establishment in 1949 and the 5th season of the Polish I liga under its current title. The league was operated by the Polish Football Association (PZPN).

The league is contested by 18 teams who competing for promotion to the 2013–14 Ekstraklasa. The regular season was played in a round-robin tournament. The champions and runners-up would receive promotion. The bottom four teams were automatically demoted to the II liga.

According to the competition rules, all clubs are required to field at least one youth player (born on 1992 or later and trained in Poland) in every game (except for the times when the only youth player on the roster is sent off or unable to continue playing, in which case he can't be substituted by a senior player).

On 28 February 2013 the Disciplinary Commission of the Polish FA suspended the ŁKS's license to compete in the I liga, because of non-payment of salaries to former players. Since the club's appeal was unsuccessful, on 5 April the Polish FA announced the cancellation of Warta–ŁKS game on the 22nd match day. On 10 April the club announced its withdrawal from the I liga. As ŁKS had already played over 50% of their games, according to the rules of I liga, they will be ranked in the final league table, with the cancelled games counted as lost 0–3.

Changes from last season

From I liga
Promoted to 2011–12 Ekstraklasa
Piast Gliwice
Pogoń Szczecin
Relegated to  II liga, Group East
Wisła Płock
Olimpia Elbląg
Relegated to  II liga, Group West
KS Polkowice
Withdrew (see below)
Ruch Radzionków

To I liga
Relegated from 2011–12 Ekstraklasa
ŁKS Łódź
Cracovia
Promoted from II liga, Group East
Okocimski KS Brzesko
Stomil Olsztyn
Promoted from II liga, Group West
Miedź Legnica
GKS Tychy

Additionalnotes 
Before the start of the season Ruch Radzionków withdrew from 2012–13 I liga, citing financial problems. The club also withdrew its reserve team from Bytom region Klasa A (7th level). However, Ruch will be able to join the 2013–14 III liga, after a one-year suspension.

Ruch's I liga spot was taken by another Silesian club, Polonia Bytom, the highest placed team of the previous season's I liga relegation zone.

Team overview

Stadiums and locations

Personnel and sponsoring

 Kolejarz displays the charity's logo on their kit.

Managerial changes

League table

Results

Season statistics

Top scorers

Clean sheets (player)

Scoring
First goal of the season: Zbigniew Zakrzewski for Miedź against Bogdanka (4 August 2012)
Largest winning margin: 6 goals
ŁKS 1–7 Flota (6 October 2012)
Highest scoring game: 8 goals
ŁKS 1–7 Flota (6 October 2012)
Most goals scored in a match by a single team: 7 goals
ŁKS 1–7 Flota (6 October 2012)
Most goals scored in a match by a losing team: 2 goals
Stomil 2–3 Kolejarz (13 April 2013)
Kolejarz 2–3 Dolcan (21 April 2013)

Clean sheets (club)
Most clean sheets: 16
Termalica
Fewest clean sheets: 2
ŁKS

Discipline
 Most yellow cards (club): 97
 Sandecja Nowy Sącz
 Most yellow cards (player): 11
 Tomáš Pešír (Bogdanka)
 Most red cards (club): 10
 Stomil Olsztyn
 Warta Poznań
 Most red cards (player): 2
 Martin Baran (Polonia Bytom)
 Paweł Baranowski (Stomil)
 Michał Benkowski (Bogdanka)
 Grzegorz Fonfara (Katowice)
 Michał Masłowski (Zawisza)
 Michał Nalepa (Termalica)
 Marcin Pietroń (Katowice)
 Dawid Sołdecki (Bogdanka)
 Łukasz Skrzyński (Zawisza)
 Dawid Szufryn (Kolejarz)
 Maciej Wichtowski (Warta)
 Konrad Wieczorek (Okocimski KS)

Notes

References

2012–13 in Polish football
Pol
I liga seasons